The Kollam Orthodox Diocese, one of the 30 dioceses of the Malankara Orthodox Syrian Church, was created after the Mulanthuruthy Synod in 1876. Zachariah Mar Anthonios is the metropolitan bishop of the diocese, whose head office is in Bishop House, Cross Junction, Kadappakada, Kollam, Kerala, India.

History

Kollam is an ancient commercial center and seaport. According to tradition, Thomas the Apostle arrived in the city and founded a church which is now underwater. Kollam is one of the seven dioceses created after the Mulanthuruthi Syrian Christian Association (synod) of 1876, led by Patriarch of Antioch Ignatius Peter IV; the other dioceses are Kottayam, Kandanadu, Angamali, Niranam, Thumpamon, and Kochi. Originally, there were over 30 churches in the diocese. Dionysious V was its first metropolitan bishop. He was succeeded by Geevarghese Gregorios of Parumala, who also led the Niranam diocese. Vattasserril Geevarghese, Geevarghese II (when the diocese's head office was in the Kundara seminary), Alexios Mar Thevodosios of Bethany (who became metropolitan in 1938), Mathews I, and Mathews II followed.

Mathews I moved the diocese's head office from Kottappuram Seminary in Kottarakkara to Cross Junction, near Kadappakada, where the bishop's house (aramana) and St. Thomas Orthodox Syrian Cathedral were built. Mathews II was appointed assistant metropolitan in 1985, and became metropolitan in 1991; the following year, there were 130 parishes and 13 churches. After his death, Didymos I became the diocese's eighth metropolitan. The Thiruvananthapuram Orthodox Diocese was created from the Kollam diocese in 1979, and the Adoor Kadampanad and Kottarakkara Punalur Orthodox Dioceses were created from the Thiruvananthapuram diocese in 2010.

Diocesan Metropolitans

Major churches

The diocese has 64 parishes. The Kadeesha Syrian Church in Port Kollam, the tomb of Mar Abo in Thevalakkara, St. Mary's Orthodox Syrian Church in West Kallada, and St. Thomas Orthodox Syrian Church in Kundara are its oldest religious buildings. Kundara Seminary, the Nedumpaikulam St. George Orthodox Syrian Church, and the Nallila Bethel St. George Orthodox Syrian Church are other churches.

Parishes
 
Ananthamon Sehion St. George Orthodox Church
Ambalanirap St. George Orthodox Church
Chowallor St. George Orthodox Church
St. Mary's Orthodox Church, Chittumala
Edavattom St. George Orthodox Church
Edakulangara Mar Gregorios Orthodox Church
Erathukulakkada Mar Gregorios Orthodox Church
Kadamanthadom Mar Gregorios Orthodox Church
Karimthottuva St. Mary's Orthodox Church
St. Mary's Orthodox Church, West Kallada  
St. George Orthodox Church, East Kallada
St. George Orthodox Church, Kareepra
St. George Orthodox Church, Puthoor
Kunathoor St. George Orthodox Church
Kulakkada St.George Orthodox Church
Kadeeshtha Orthodox Church, Kundara
St. Thomas Orthodox Church, Kundara 
St. George Orthodox Church, Kaithacode 
St. Elijah Orthodox Church, Koduvila
Kollam Kadeesha Orthodox Church
St. Thomas Orthodox Cathedral, Kollam 
Mar Semavoon Desthuni Orthodox Church, Manjakala 
St. Mary's Salem Orthodox Church, Manappally 
St. George Orthodox Church, Maruthoorbhagam
Mar Thevodoros Orthodox Church, Madhavasseri 
St. Peter and Paul Orthodox Church, Maranadu 
Mar Barsauma Orthodox Church, Maranadu 
St. Stephen's Orthodox Church, Mukhathala
St.George Orthodox Church, Mukhathala
St. Mary's Orthodox Church, Muthupilakkadu
St. George Orthodox Church, Muthupilakkadu
St. Mary's Orthodox Church, Mynagapally
St. George Orthodox Church, Nallila
St. Gabriel Orthodox Church, Nallila
St. George Orthodox Church, Nadutheri
St. Mary's Orthodox Church, Nedumbaikulam
St. George Orthodox Church, Nedumbaikulam
St. Thomas Orthodox Church, Pattazhy
St. George Orthodox Church, Pattazhy
St. Mary's Orthodox Church, Pattazhy
Mar Gregorios Orthodox Church, Pattazhy
St. Stephen's Orthodox Church, Pandithitta
St. Thomas Orthodox Church, Perinadu
Mar Kuriakose Orthodox Church, Perayam
St. John the Baptist Orthodox Church, Perumpuzha
St. George Orthodox Church, Puthoor
Mar Baselios Gregorios Orthodox Church, Poruvazhy
St. Thomas Orthodox Church, Sooranad
St. Mary's Orthodox Church, Sooranad
St. Thomas Orthodox Valiyapally, Thazhava
St. Mary's Orthodox Church, Thalavoor
Marthamariam Orthodox Church, Thamarakkudy
Marthamariam Orthodox Church, Thevalakara
St. George Orthodox Church, Thevalappuram
St. George Orthodox Church, Kundara Kuzhimathikadu
St. Mary's Orthodox Church, Perinad
St. Thomas Orthodox puthenpally , Thrippilazhikom
St. Thomas Orthodox sehion church, Thrippilazhikom

References

External links
Malankara Orthodox Church website

Malankara Orthodox Syrian Church dioceses
1876 establishments in India